László Zarándi (born 10 June 1929) was a Hungarian athlete who mainly competed in the 100 metres. He was born in Kiskunfélegyháza.

He began his career in sport in 1946/47 as a soccer player in the team of SZVSE. At the high school he continued to play soccer, but trained also in athletics: 100 meter and high jump. In 1950 he was elected in the national team of Hungary for 4 x 100 meters relay. He competed for Hungary at the 1952 Summer Olympics held in Helsinki, Finland where he won the bronze medal in the men's 4 x 100 metre relay with his team mates Géza Varasdi, György Csányi and Béla Goldoványi. Together with the same team, he won the gold medal on 29 August 1954 in Bern, at the European Championship of Athletics in the men 4 x 100 meter relay.

Since 1952 he has been teaching at the High Schoeo for Physical Education and he has trained jumpers like László Szalma (fourth place at the Olympic Games in 1980) and Dragán Ivanov.

References

External links
 
 
 
 

1929 births
Living people
People from Kiskunfélegyháza
Hungarian male sprinters
Olympic bronze medalists for Hungary
Athletes (track and field) at the 1952 Summer Olympics
Olympic athletes of Hungary
European Athletics Championships medalists
Medalists at the 1952 Summer Olympics
Olympic bronze medalists in athletics (track and field)
Sportspeople from Bács-Kiskun County